is a railway station on the Kyūdai Main Line in Kokonoe, Ōita Prefecture, Japan.

Lines

Layout 
The station consists of two side platforms serving two tracks at grade with a siding. The station building, built in 2015, is a plaster wall traditional Japanese design made to resemble a sake brewery. It houses a waiting area as well as a museum on the history of the town. From the station building, a short flight of steps leads up to platform 1. Access to the opposite side platform is by means of a level crossing.

Adjacent stations

History
The Daito Railway was nationalized on 1 December 1922, after which Japanese Government Railways (JGR) undertook phased westward expansion of the track which, at the time, it had designated as the Daito Line. By 1928, the track had reached . Subsequently, the track was extended further west and Bungo-Mori was opened as the new western terminus on 15 December 1929. On the same day, Era was opened as an intermediate station along the new track. On 15 November 1934, when the Daito Line had linked up with the Kyudai Main Line further west, JGR designated the station as part of the Kyudai Main Line. With the privatization of Japanese National Railways (JNR), the successor of JGR, on 1 April 1987, the station came under the control of JR Kyushu.

In the early hours of 18 January 2014, the original station building built in 1929 and an adjoining residence burned down in a fire. Subsequently, the Kokonoe town authorities rebuilt the station building, opening it in March 2015. The new building also housed a museum featuring exhibits about the local sake brewing industry. In keeping with this theme, the station building was designed to resemble the nearby Yatsushika Brewery, complete with a ball of cedar needles indicating that a fresh batch of sake has been brewed.

Passenger statistics
In fiscal 2015, there were a total of 14,803 boarding passengers, giving a daily average of 41 passengers.

Surrounding area
Yatsushika sake brewery - the station building was designed to resemble this nearby brewery
 Higashi-Iida Junior High School
 Higashi-Iida Elementary School

See also
 List of railway stations in Japan

References

External links
Era (JR Kyushu)

Railway stations in Ōita Prefecture
Stations of Kyushu Railway Company
Railway stations in Japan opened in 1929